Kika Karadi (born 1975) is a Hungarian-American artist. She is known for her abstract painting style.

About
Kika Karadi was born in 1975 in Budapest, Hungary  and moved to the United States at age 11. She attended Maryland Institute College of Art (MICA) and graduated with a B.F.A. in 1997.

Karadi had her first European solo show in Naples, Italy, in 2006. In 2017, she was an artist in residence at the Chinati Foundation in Marfa, Texas. She has held solo exhibitions at the Jonathan Viner Gallery in London and The Journal Gallery in New York City.

Technique
Karadi is noted for her large-scale paintings made in response to the aesthetics of the film noir genre. Her paintings were described as "black stenciled signage on a white background", in which she "reintroduces hints of representation - atmospheric cinematic scenes, figurative forms and symbols which welcome the impurities of cultural collision." She approaches painting with a monographic technique. Her body of work using this process refers to the abandoned Oak Park Mall in Austin, Minnesota where she maintained her studio since early 2014.

Personal life
In 2017, Karadi married the American musician John Maus. In May 2018, during a Q&A conducted on Reddit, Maus commented that Karadi had split from him "about a week and a half ago". She and Maus reconciled in the summer of 2020. Later the same year, she joined her husband in donating in support of the Republican Party.

References

External links
 images of Karadi's work on Mutual art

American women painters
Hungarian emigrants to the United States
1975 births
Living people
Painters from New York (state)
21st-century American women artists
Maryland Institute College of Art alumni